Marco Zambelli (born 22 August 1985) is an Italian footballer who plays as a defender.

Club career
A native of Gavardo, Province of Brescia, Zambelli has spent most of his career at Brescia Calcio. He played his first Serie A match on 26 September 2004, made him received call-up from Italy U20 and Italy U21.

On 5 August 2019, he signed with Feralpisalò.

References

External links
 Profile at FIGC 
 Profile at Football.it 

Italian footballers
Italy under-21 international footballers
Brescia Calcio players
Empoli F.C. players
Calcio Foggia 1920 players
FeralpiSalò  players
Serie A players
Serie B players
Serie C players
Association football defenders
Sportspeople from the Province of Brescia
1985 births
Living people
Footballers from Lombardy